The House of Bonaparte (originally Buonaparte) is a former imperial and royal European dynasty of Italian (Genoese) origin. It was founded in 1804 by Napoleon I, the son of Corsican nobleman Carlo Buonaparte and Letizia Buonaparte (née Ramolino).  Napoleon was a French military leader who rose to power during the French Revolution and who, in 1804, transformed the First French Republic into the First French Empire, five years after his coup d'état of November 1799 (18 Brumaire).  Napoleon and the Grande Armée had to fight against every major European power (except for the ones he was allied with, including Denmark-Norway) and dominated continental Europe through a series of military victories during the Napoleonic Wars.  He installed members of his family on the thrones of client states, expanding the power of the dynasty.

The House of Bonaparte formed the Imperial House of France during the French Empire, together with some non-Bonaparte family members. In addition to holding the title of Emperor of the French, the Bonaparte dynasty held various other titles and territories during the Napoleonic Wars, including the Kingdom of Italy, the Kingdom of Spain, the Kingdom of Westphalia, the Kingdom of Holland, and the Kingdom of Naples. The dynasty held power for around a decade until the Napoleonic Wars began to take their toll. Making very powerful enemies, such as Austria, Britain, Russia, and Prussia, as well as royalist (particularly Bourbon) restorational movements in France, Spain, the Two Sicilies, and Sardinia, the dynasty eventually collapsed due to the final defeat of Napoleon at the Battle of Waterloo and the restoration of former dynasties by the Congress of Vienna.

During the reign of Napoleon I, the Imperial Family consisted of the Emperor's immediate relations – his wife, son, siblings, and some other close relatives, namely his brother-in-law Joachim Murat, his uncle Joseph Fesch, and his stepson Eugène de Beauharnais.

Between 1852 and 1870, there was a Second French Empire, when a member of the Bonaparte dynasty again ruled France: Napoleon III, the youngest son of Louis Bonaparte. However, during the Franco-Prussian War of 1870–1871, the dynasty was again ousted from the Imperial Throne. Since that time, there has been a series of pretenders. Supporters of the Bonaparte family's claim to the throne of France are known as Bonapartists. Current head Jean-Christophe, Prince Napoléon, has a Bourbon mother.

Italian origins
The Bonaparte (originally ) family were patricians in the Italian towns of Sarzana, San Miniato and Florence. The name derives from Italian: buona ("good") and parte ("part" or "side").
 
Gianfaldo Buonaparte was the first known Buonaparte at Sarzana around 1200. His descendant Giovanni Buonaparte in 1397 married Isabella Calandrini, a cousin of later cardinal Filippo Calandrini. Giovanni became mayor of Sarzana and was named commissioner of the Lunigiana by Giovanni Maria Visconti in 1408. His daughter, Agnella Berni, was the great-grandmother of Italian poet Francesco Berni and their great-grandson Francesco Buonaparte was an equestrian mercenary at the service of the Genoese Bank of Saint George. In 1490, Francesco Buonaparte went to the island of Corsica, which was controlled by the bank. In 1493, he married the daughter of Guido da Castelletto, representative of the Bank of Saint George in Ajaccio, Corsica. Most of their descendants during subsequent generations were members of the Ajaccio town council. Napoleon's father, Carlo Buonaparte, received a patent of nobility from the King of France in 1771.

There also existed a Buonaparte family in Florence; however, its eventual relation with the Sarzana and San Miniato families is unknown. Jacopo Buonaparte of San Miniato was a friend and advisor to Medici Pope Clement VII. Jacopo was also a witness to and wrote an account of the sack of Rome, which is one of the most important historical documents recounting that event. Two of Jacopo's nephews, Pier Antonio Buonaparte and Giovanni Buonaparte, however, took part in the 1527 Medici rebellion, after which they were banished from Florence and later were restored by Alessandro de' Medici, Duke of Florence. Jacopo's brother Benedetto Buonaparte maintained political neutrality. The San Miniato branch extinguished with Jacopo in 1550. The last member of the Florence family was a canon named Gregorio Bonaparte, who died in 1803, leaving Napoleon as heir.

A Buonaparte tomb lies in the Church of San Francesco in San Miniato. A second tomb, the Chapelle Impériale, was built by Napoleon III in Ajaccio 1857.

Imperial House of France

Napoleon I is the most prominent name associated with the Bonaparte family because he conquered much of Europe during the early 19th century. Due to his indisputable popularity in France both among the people and in the army, he staged the Coup of 18 Brumaire and overthrew the Directory with the help of his brother Lucien Bonaparte, president of the Council of Five Hundred. Napoleon then oversaw the creation of a new Constitution that made him the First Consul of France on 10 November 1799. On 2 December 1804, he crowned himself Emperor of the French and ruled from 1804 to 1814, and again in 1815 during the Hundred Days after his return from Elba.

Following his conquest of most of Western Europe, Napoleon I made his elder brother Joseph king first of Naples and then of Spain, his younger brother Louis King of Holland (subsequently forcing his abdication in 1810 after his failure to subordinate Dutch interests to those of France), and his youngest brother Jérôme King of Westphalia, a short-lived realm created from several states of northwestern Germany.

Napoleon's son Napoléon François Charles Joseph was created King of Rome and was later styled as Napoléon II by loyalists of the dynasty, though he only ruled for two weeks after his father's abdication.

Louis-Napoléon, son of Louis, was President of France and then Emperor of the French from 1852 to 1870, reigning as Napoleon III. His son, Napoléon, Prince Imperial, died fighting the Zulus in Natal, today the South African province of KwaZulu-Natal. With his death, the family lost much of its remaining political appeal, though claimants continue to assert their right to the imperial title. A political movement for Corsican independence surfaced in the 1990s which included a Bonapartist restoration in its programme.

Crowns held by the family

Emperors of the French
Napoleon I (1804–1814, 1815), also King of Italy (1805–1814) and Emperor in Elba (1814–1815) and Co-Prince of Andorra (1804–1814, 1815)
Napoleon II (1815), styled as King of Rome from birth, but never reigned and also Duke of Reichstadt 1818–1832, but never visited the town
Napoleon III (1852–1870), also Co-Prince of Andorra (1852–1870)

Kings of Holland
Louis I (1806–1810)
Louis II (1810), also Grand Duke of Berg (1809–1813)

King of Naples
Joseph I (1806–1808)

King of Westphalia
Jérôme I (1807–1813)

King of Spain
Joseph I (1808–1813)

Grand Duchess of Tuscany
 Elisa Bonaparte (1809–1814), also Princess of Lucca and Piombino (1805–1814)

Heads of the House of Bonaparte (since 1852)

Napoléon III (1852–1873)
Napoléon IV Eugène (1873–1879), son of Napoléon III
Napoléon V Victor (1879–1926), grandson of Napoléon I's youngest brother, Jérôme Bonaparte
Napoléon VI Louis (1926–1997), son of Napoléon V Victor
Disputed since 1997:
Napoléon VII Charles (1997–present), son of Napoléon VI Louis
Napoléon VII Jean-Christophe (1997–present), grandson of Napoléon VI Louis

The family tree

Note: Bold for common names
Carlo-Maria (Ajaccio, 1746–Montpellier, 1785) married Maria Letizia Ramolino (Ajaccio, 1750–Rome, 1836) in 1764. He was a minor official in the local courts. They had eight children:

Joseph-Napoléon Bonaparte (Corte, 1768–Florence, 1844), King of Naples, then King of Spain, married Julie Clary.
Julie Joséphine Bonaparte (1796–1796)
Zénaïde Laetitia Julie Bonaparte (1801–1854)
Charlotte Napoléone Bonaparte (1802–1839)
Napoléon (I) Bonaparte (1769–1821) Emperor of the French: Married (i) Joséphine de Beauharnais; no issue. Adopted Eugène and Hortense de Beauharnais. Married (ii) Marie Louise of Austria; 
Napoléon (II) François Joseph Charles Bonaparte (1811–1832), Prince Imperial, King of Rome, Prince of Parma, son of Archduchess Marie Louise of Austria (of the Habsburg dynasty), Empress consort, then Duchess of Parma
 Lucien Bonaparte (1775–1840) Roman Prince of Canino and Musignano
3 daughters with first wife, Christine Boyer:
Charlotte Philistine Bonaparte (1795–1865), married Prince Mario Gabrielli
Victoire Gertrude Bonaparte (1797–1797)
Christine Charlotte Alexandrine Egypta Bonaparte (1798–1847), married Count Arvid Posse, then married Lord Dudley Stuart
10 children with second wife, Alexandrine de Bleschamp:
Charles Lucien Jules Laurent Bonaparte (1803–1857), ornithologist and politician married Princess Zénaïde Bonaparte (1801–1854)
Joseph Lucien Charles Napoléon Bonaparte (1824–1865)
Alexandrine Gertrude Zénaïde Bonaparte (1826–1828)
Lucien Louis Joseph Napoléon (Cardinal) Bonaparte (1828–1895)
Julie Charlotte Pauline Zénaïde Laetitia Désirée Bartholomée Bonaparte (1830–1900)
Charlotte Honorine Joséphine Pauline Bonaparte (1832–1901)
Léonie Stéphanie Elise Bonaparte (1833–1839)
Marie Désirée Eugénie Joséphine Philomène Bonaparte (1835–1890)
Augusta Amélie Maximilienne Jacqueline Bonaparte (1836–1900)
Napoléon Charles Grégoire Jacques Philippe Bonaparte (1839–1899)
Zénaïde Victoire Eugénie Bonaparte (1860–1862)
Marie Léonie Eugénie Mathilde Jeanne Julie Zénaïde Bonaparte (1870–1947)
Eugénie Laetitia Barbe Caroline Lucienne Marie Jeanne Bonaparte (1872–1949)
Bathilde Aloïse Léonie Bonaparte (1840–1861)
Albertine Marie Thérèse Bonaparte (1842–1842)
Charles Albert Edmond Bonaparte (1843–1847)
Laetitia Christine Bonaparte (1804–1871)
Joseph Lucien Bonaparte (1806–1807)
Jeanne Adélaïde Bonaparte (1807–1829)
Paul Marie Bonaparte (1808–1827)
Louis Lucien Bonaparte (1813–1891)
Pierre Napoléon Bonaparte (1815–1881) married Éléonore-Justine Ruflin
Roland Bonaparte (1858–1924) married Marie-Félix Blanc
Princess Marie Bonaparte (1882–1962) married Prince George of Greece
Princess Jeanne Bonaparte (1861–1910)
Antoine Lucien Bonaparte (1816–1877)
Alexandrine Marie Bonaparte (1818–1874)
Constance Marie Bonaparte (1823–1876)
 Maria-Anna Elisa Bonaparte (1777–1820), Grand-Duchess of Tuscany, married Felice Baciocchi, Prince of Lucca
 Marie-Laetitia Bonaparte Baciocchi 
Louis-Napoléon Bonaparte (1778–1846), King of Holland, married Hortense de Beauharnais, Napoleon's stepdaughter
Napoléon Charles Bonaparte (1802–1807)
Napoléon Louis Bonaparte (1804–1831)
Charles Louis Napoléon (III) Bonaparte (1808–1873) Emperor of the French, married Maria Eugenia Ignacia Augustina Palafox de Guzmán Portocarrero y Kirkpatrick
Napoléon Eugène Louis John Joseph Bonaparte, Prince Imperial (1856–1879)
Maria Paola or Marie Pauline Bonaparte (1780–1825) Princess and Duchess of Guastalla, married in 1797 to French General Charles Leclerc and later married Camillo Borghese, 6th Prince of Sulmona.
 Maria Annunziata Caroline Bonaparte (1782–1839) married Joachim Murat, Marshal of France, Grand Duke of Berg, then King of Naples
Prince Achille Murat (1801–1847), married Catherine Willis Gray (1803–1867), great-grandniece of George Washington.
Prince Napoléon Lucien Charles Murat (1803–1878), married Caroline Georgina Fraser (1810–1879).
5 Children, including:
 Joachim Joseph Napoléon Murat, 4th Prince Murat (1834–1901), Major-General of the French Army, married firstly Malcy Louise Caroline Berthier de Wagram (1832–1884) and had issue, and secondly Lydia Hervey, without issue.
Prince Louis Napoléon Murat (1851–1912), married in Odessa, Eudoxia Mikhailovna Somova (1850–1924), had issue now extinct in male line.
Jérôme-Napoléon Bonaparte (1784–1860), King of Westphalia
1 child from first marriage, to Betsy Patterson of Baltimore:
Jérôme Napoléon Bonaparte (1805–1870), married Susan May Williams and had 2 sons :
Jerome Napoleon Bonaparte II (1830–1893), married Caroline Le Roy Appleton Edgar
Louise-Eugénie Bonaparte (1873–1923), married in 1896 Count Adam Carl von Moltke-Huitfeld (1864–1944); numerous descendants
Jerome Napoléon Charles Bonaparte III (1878–1945), married Blanche Pierce Stenbeigh, no issue
Charles Joseph Bonaparte (1851–1921), United States Secretary of the Navy and United States Attorney General, married Ellen Channing Day, no issue
3 children from second marriage, to Princess Catharina of Württemberg:
Jérôme Napoléon Charles Bonaparte I (1814–1847), unmarried and childless
Mathilde Laetitia Wilhelmine Bonaparte (1820–1904), married Anatoly Nikolaievich Demidov, 1st Prince of San Donato: no issue
Napoléon Joseph Charles Paul Bonaparte, Prince Napoléon (1822–1891), called Plon-Plon married Princess Marie Clothilde of Savoy daughter of Victor Emmanuel II of Italy
Napoléon Victor Jérôme Frédéric Bonaparte, Prince Napoléon (1862–1926) married Princess Clémentine of Belgium
Marie Clotilde Eugénie Alberte Laetitia Geneviève Bonaparte (1912–1996) married Count Serge de Witt
Louis Jérôme Victor Emmanuel Léopold Marie Bonaparte, Prince Napoléon (1914–1997), married Alix de Foresta
Charles Marie Jérôme Victor Bonaparte, Prince Napoléon (born 1950)
Two children from first marriage, to Princess Béatrice of Bourbon-Two Sicilies:
Caroline Marie Constance Bonaparte (Princess Caroline Napoléon) (born 1980)
Jean-Christophe Louis Ferdinand Albéric Bonaparte, Prince Napoléon (born 1986) married Countess Olympia von und zu Arco-Zinneberg
Louis Charles Riprand Victor Jérôme Marie Napoléon (born 2022)
1 child and 1 adopted child from second marriage, to Jeanne-Françoise Valliccioni:
Sophie Catherine Bonaparte (born 1992)
Anh Laëtitia Bonaparte (born 1998, adopted)
Catherine Elisabeth Albérique Marie Bonaparte (born 1950)
Laure Clémentine Geneviève Bonaparte (born 1952)
Jérôme Xavier Marie Joseph Victor Bonaparte (Prince Jérôme Napoléon) (born 1957), married in 2013 with Licia Innocenti 
Napoléon Louis Joseph Jérôme Bonaparte (1864–1932) Russian General, unmarried and childless
Marie Laetitia Eugénie Catherine Adélaïde Bonaparte (1866–1926) married Prince Amedeo of Savoy, Duke of Aosta

Bonaparte arms
The arms of the Bonaparte family were: Gules two bends sinister between two mullets or. In 1804, Napoleon I changed the arms to Azure an imperial eagle or. The change applied to all members of his family except for his brother Lucien and his nephew, the son from Jerome's first marriage.

DNA research 
According to studies by G. Lucotte and his coauthors based on DNA research since 2011, Napoleon Bonaparte belonged to Y-DNA (direct male ancestry) haplogroup E1b1b1c1* (E-M34*). This 15000-year-old haplogroup has its highest concentration in Ethiopia and in the Near East (Jordan, Yemen). According to the authors of the study, "Probably Napoléon also knew his remote oriental patrilineal origins, because Francesco Buonaparte (the Giovanni son), who was a mercenary under the orders of the Genoa Republic in Ajaccio in 1490, was nicknamed The Maure of Sarzane." The latest study identifies the common Bonaparte DNA markers from Carlo (Charles) Bonaparte to 3 living descendants.

Lucotte et al. published in October 2013 the extended Y-STR of Napoleon I based on descendant testing, and the descendants were E-M34, just like the emperor's beard hair tested a year before. The persons tested were the patrilineal descendants of Jérome Bonaparte, one of Napoleon's brothers, and of Alexandre Colonna-Walewski, Napoleon's illegitimate son with Marie Walewska. These three tests all yielded the same Y-STR haplotype (109 markers) confirming with 100% certainty that the first Emperor of the French belonged to the M34 branch of haplogroup E1b1b.

STR strongly suggests that the Bonaparte belong to the Y58897 branch, which means that the ancestor 3000 years ago or a bit more lived in Anatolia, but all relatives in the database with a common ancestor with over a 1000 years are found in their own the Massa - La Spezia small area in Italy. There are at the moment no relatives in the database older than that, which means they are very rare in Europe.

Living members
Charles, Prince Napoléon (born 1950, great-great-grandson of Jérôme Bonaparte by his second marriage), and his son Jean-Christophe, Prince Napoléon (born 1986 and appointed heir in the will of his grandfather Louis, Prince Napoléon) currently dispute the headship of the Bonaparte family. The only other male members of the family are Charles's recently married (2013) brother, Prince Jérôme Napoléon (born 1957) and Jean-Christophe's son, Prince Louis Napoléon (born 2022). There are no other legitimate descendants in the male line from Napoleon I or from his brothers.

There are, however, numerous descendants of Napoleon's illegitimate but unacknowledged son, Count Alexandre Colonna-Walewski (1810–1868), born from Napoleon I's union with Marie, Countess Walewski. A descendant of Napoleon's sister Caroline Bonaparte was actor René Auberjonois. Recent DNA-matches with living descendants of Jérôme and Count Walewski have confirmed the existence of descendants of Lucien Bonaparte, Napoleon's brother, namely the Clovis family.

See also
 Bonapartism
Bonapartists (Political party)
 History of France
 History of Spain
 History of Italy
 History of the Netherlands
 Line of succession to the French throne (Bonapartist)
 Napoleon (disambiguation)
 Timeline of the Napoleonic era

Footnotes

References

External links

 The coat of arms of the Tuscan branch of Bonaparte family in State Archives of Florence

|-

|-

|-

|-

|-

|-

|-

 
Roman Catholic families
Italian nobility